The 2022 Las Vegas Challenger was a professional tennis tournament played on hard courts. It was the seventh edition of the revamped tournament which was the part of the 2022 ATP Challenger Tour. It took place in Las Vegas, United States between 24 and 30 October 2022.

Singles main draw entrants

Seeds

 1 Rankings are as of October 17, 2022.

Other entrants
The following players received wildcards into the singles main draw:
  Alexander Cozbinov
  Cannon Kingsley
  Maxim Verboven

The following player received entry into the singles main draw as an alternate:
  Govind Nanda

The following players received entry from the qualifying draw:
  Simon Carr
  Omni Kumar
  Aidan Mayo
  Alfredo Perez
  Jack Pinnington Jones
  Tennys Sandgren

Champions

Singles

  Tennys Sandgren def.  Stefan Kozlov 7–5, 6–3.

Doubles

  Julian Cash /  Henry Patten def.  Constantin Frantzen /  Reese Stalder 6–4, 7–6(7–1).

References

Las Vegas Challenger
Tennis in Las Vegas
2022 in American tennis
October 2022 sports events in the United States
2022
2022 in sports in Nevada